Nickolas is a variation of the given name Nicholas.

Nickolas may refer to:

People
Nickolas Ashford (1941–2011), American singer with Ashford & Simpson
Nickolas Butler (born 1979), American writer
Nick Carter (musician) (born 1980), American entertainer
Nickolas Davatzes (fl. 1983–2006), American television executive
Nickolas Grace (born 1947), English actor
Nickolas Levasseur (fl. 2006–2014), American politician, New Hampshire
Nickolas Morin-Soucy (born 1984), former professional Canadian footballer
Nickolas Muray (1892-1965), Hungarian-born American photographer and Olympic fencer
Nickolas Perry (born 1967), American writer, film director, editor, and photographer

Characters
Nick Sobotka, character on American drama The Wire

See also
Nicholas (disambiguation)
Nickolaus
Nikolaos (disambiguation)
Nickolai Stoilov